The Ryedale Roman Bronzes (also known as the Ryedale Hoard) is an assemblage of Roman metalwork.

Discovery
The assemblage was found by metal detectorists James Spark and Mark Didlick in a field near Ampleforth in Ryedale, North Yorkshire, in May 2020.

Contents and significance
The assemblage comprises four pieces of metalwork, all of which are copper-alloys. They are: 1) a plumb bob, 2) a horse and rider figurine, 3) a figural horse head with an iron shank (probably a key), and 4) a figural bust (a sceptre head). The sceptre head is in the shape of an Emperor, probably Marcus Aurelius, and so dates to the late 2nd-century AD. In the Portable Antiquities Scheme record Dr John Pearce commented that the assemblage probably derived from a ritual context.

Dr Andrew Woods, senior curator at the Yorkshire Museum, has described the find as being of "national significance and great rarity."

Acquisition and public display
The assemblage comprised non-precious metals so did not qualify as treasure under the terms of the Treasure Act 1996. It was placed on public display at Hansons Auctioneers in London on 28th April 2021. It was originally valued at between £70,000 and £90,000. In May 2021 it was sold in the private auction for £185,000. The Yorkshire Museum purchased the assemblage from David Aaron Ltd., who had originally bought it, with financial support from a private donor Richard Beleson, the Art Fund and other private donors. 

They were displayed at the Frieze Art Fair in London from 13 to 17 October 2021 before being added to the Yorkshire Museum's collection. In February 2022 it announced that the museum, which had been closed since November 2021, would reopen on 8 April 2022 with a new exhibition focussing on the hoard.

References

Archaeological sites in North Yorkshire
Collections of the Yorkshire Museum
Ryedale
2020 in England
2020 archaeological discoveries